The 1985 Brazilian Grand Prix (officially known as the XIV Grande Prêmio do Brasil) was a Formula One motor race held at Jacarepaguá in Jacarepaguá, Rio de Janeiro on 7 April 1985. It was the first round of the 1985 Formula One World Championship, and marked the 13th edition of the Brazilian Grand Prix as a round of the World Championship since its inception in 1950.

Alain Prost, driving for McLaren was the defending race winner heading into the race. In qualifying, Ferrari driver, Michele Alboreto took pole, his second of his career. In the race, he would finish second on the podium behind eventual race winner, Prost while Elio de Angelis rounded out the podium in the Lotus car. Of note, even though René Arnoux finished 4th for Ferrari, he was sacked after the race, with both the team and Arnoux never revealing the reason behind the sacking. The driver who finished 7th in this race, Stefan Johansson, was picked up by the Scuderia for the rest of the year. This race was also Nigel Mansell's first race of seven seasons with the Williams team.

Background
The 1985 Formula One season saw an entry list of 28 drivers competing with Zakspeed officially joining Formula One with Jonathan Palmer as their driver, though they wouldn't be competing in the opening round as they were going to join the field in Portugal. The other brand new team that was competing in the 1985 season was Minardi who had competed in Formula Two from 1980 to 1984 with a custom chassis before stepping up and competing in F1. The Toleman team, meanwhile, missed the race due to being unable to secure a tyre contract. Their lead driver, Stefan Johansson, was present, however, and substituted for Stefan Bellof when the German driver was suspended by his Tyrrell team due to a contract dispute.

The opening round in Brazil was the first round of the 1985 championship, this was the 14th edition of the Brazilian Grand Prix since its inception in 1972. It's also the 13th time that a Formula One World Championship had been held there with the 1972 edition being a non-championship race. The race was held at the Jacarepaguá circuit which held its first Grand Prix in 1978 and had been holding the Grand Prix since 1981.

Qualifying
Qualifying for the 1985 Brazilian Grand Prix was held in two sessions with one being held on the Friday and the other being held on the Saturday. In the Friday session, Lotus who did some aerodynamic tweaks to the car similar to the Lola's new Indycar as they went to the top of the timesheets on Friday morning. But for Elio de Angelis he wouldn't be able to improve on his time with de Angelis responding after the second qualifying session, "I am sure I could have retained the pole." Senna would improve on his lap time but only slightly as he finished behind de Angelis on the grid in fourth.

On the front row of the grid, Michele Alboreto would claim the first pole position of the season with a time of 1:27.768, a full one second ahead of his time on the Friday. Alboreto team-mate in Rene Arnoux also improve his time by a second. But had to start the race in seventh place with Arnoux needing to use the spare car after the Ferrari engine was down on power on his main car. Also on the front row of the grid was Keke Rosberg in the Williams-Honda who earlier in the weekend had a blown turbo from their engine on the Saturday morning. But one flying lap secured Rosberg a front row start with team mate Nigel Mansell starting from fifth.

McLaren also has engine issues with the attempts of trying to do a qualifying boost not being able to run properly with the two drivers eventually starting in sixth (Alain Prost) and ninth (Niki Lauda) on the grid. Eighth on the grid was the first of the Pirelli's with Brabham driver, Nelson Piquet being the quickest. The designer of Brabham, Gordon Murray advised that their winter testing had been for the best race tyre and not for taking any pole positions in the first few races of the season. Rounding out the top ten was Renault driver, Derek Warwick who was 2.3 seconds off the pace. His team-mate, Patrick Tambay who started behind him in 11th advised that Renault was "four seconds behind the pace when we first tested the car here a month ago. Now it had been reduced to two seconds."

Qualifying classification

Race
The race temperature for the race was a  degree day as the driver's had line-up. Before the race, Prost finished fastest in the warm-up session ahead of Alboreto and Lauda rounding out the top three. When the race began, the front row made a perfect start with Rosberg just edging out Alboreto into the first corner with the other Williams car in Mansell also getting off to a great start. He would get behind Alboreto before a bump on the rear wheel would see him go to the outside of the turn and off the racing line. This incident would end his race a few laps later with body damage issues.

Race classification

Championship standings after the race

Drivers' Championship standings

Constructors' Championship standings

Note: Only the top five positions are included for both sets of standings.

References

Brazilian Grand Prix
Brazilian Grand Prix
Grand Prix
Brazilian Grand Prix